Pangayaw means to "raid" or "to sail to battle" in various Philippine languages. It can refer to:

Mangayaw, naval raids and piracy conducted by the warrior class in various precolonial Philippine societies
Penjajap, a type of long and narrow warship used for raiding by various Austronesian ethnic groups in the southern Philippines, Brunei, Sabah, and the Maluku Islands

See also
Viking raid warfare and tactics